Clarence Benjamin Miller (March 13, 1872 – January 10, 1922) was a U.S. Representative from Minnesota. He was born in Pine Island, Minnesota and attended the country school, high school, and the Minneapolis Academy; was graduated from the academic department of the University of Minnesota at Minneapolis in 1895 and from the law department of the same institution in 1900; superintendent of the public schools of Rushford, Minnesota, 1895 – 1898; was admitted to the bar in 1900 and commenced the practice of law in Duluth; member of the State House of Representatives in 1907; elected as a Republican to the 61st, 62nd, 63rd, 64th, and 65th congresses, (March 4, 1909 – March 3, 1919); unsuccessful candidate for reelection in 1918; member of the congressional investigating committee to the Philippine Islands in 1915; special investigator for the War Department to the western front in France in 1917; elected assistant secretary of the Republican National Committee in 1919 and was chosen its secretary in 1920; engaged in the practice of law in Washington, D.C.; died in Saint Paul, Minnesota; interment in Pine Island Cemetery, Pine Island.

References 
 Minnesota Legislators Past and Present

1872 births
1922 deaths
Republican Party members of the Minnesota House of Representatives
University of Minnesota alumni
University of Minnesota Law School alumni
Republican Party members of the United States House of Representatives from Minnesota
People from Pine Island, Minnesota
Minnesota lawyers